John Davies (23 October 1868 – 15 March 1940) was a Welsh author from Betws yn Rhos, near Abergele. Davies received his education from the Liverpool Institute. He was employed for many years as a cleric for the Great Western Railway at Newport, Cardiff and Bridgwater. Following his retirement he travelled widely, examining manuscripts and collecting materials with the intention of producing a substantial biography of the 18th-century antiquary Moses Williams. The work was completed and published in 1937 by the University of Wales Press.

Davies died in Cardiff in March 1940 and was buried at Llanishen.

References 

1868 births
1940 deaths
People from Conwy County Borough
Welsh writers